The 1991 OTB International Open was a combined men's and women's tennis tournament played on outdoor hard courts that was part of the World Series of the 1991 ATP Tour. It was the fifth edition of the tournament and was held in Schenectady, New York in the United States from August 19 through August 26, 1991. Michael Stich and Brenda Schultz won the singles titles.

Finals

Men's singles

 Michael Stich defeated  Emilio Sánchez 6–2, 6–4
 It was Stich's 4th title of the year and the 9th of his career.

Women's singles

 Brenda Schultz  defeated  Alexia Dechaume 7–6(7–5), 6–2
 It was Schultz' 1st singles title of her career.

Men's doubles

 Javier Sánchez /  Todd Woodbridge defeated  Andrés Gómez /  Emilio Sánchez 3–6, 7–6, 7–6
 It was Sánchez's 3rd title of the year and the 16th of his career. It was Woodbridge's 5th title of the year and the 7th of his career.

Women's doubles

 Rachel McQuillan /  Claudia Porwik defeated  Nicole Arendt /  Shannan McCarthy 6–2, 6–4

References

OTB Open
OTB International Open
OTB International Open
OTB International Open
OTB International Open
OTB International Open